Alemdar Sabitovich Karamanov (Ukrainian: Алемда́р Сабі́тович Карама́нов, Russian: Алемда́р Сабитович Карама́нов; September 10 , 1934 - May 3, 2007) was a Russian-Ukrainian composer.

Early life
Karamanov was born on September 10, 1934, in Simferopol. His father, Sabit Temel Kağırman, was of Turkish origin and who left Turkey and emigrated to Crimea. In 1958 Karamanov graduated from the Moscow Conservatory, where he studied with S. Bogatyrev (composition), V. A. Natanson (piano). In graduate school (1958-1963), he was listed with D. B. Kabalevsky, but actually studied with T. N. Khrennikov, who highly appreciated Karamanov's talent. He continued his graduate studies with Tikhon Khrennikov and Dmitri Kabalevsky. Karamanov is above all a composer of symphonies. During his student days, he wrote 10 symphonies, which were later to be followed by 14 (or 15) more.

Career
In 1992, he composed the anthem of the Autonomous Republic of Crimea.

Death
Karamanov died on the night of May 2-3, 2007 in Simferopol.

Honours
The minor planet 4274 Karamanov, discovered in 1980 by Nikolai Chernykh, is named in his honour.

References 

1934 births
2007 deaths
Russian people of Turkish descent
Ukrainian people of Turkish descent
Ukrainian classical composers
Ukrainian composers
20th-century classical composers
Russian composers